was a former monk of the Tendai Buddhist sect and controversial disciple of Hōnen who advocated the  that led to his public censure, his later expulsion by Hōnen and eventual exile to Shikoku.  Kōsai taught that one recitation of Amitabha Buddha's name, the nembutsu, would be sufficient for rebirth in the Pure Land, and that further recitations would indicate a lack of faith on the part of the believer.  Thus, he taught a path strictly based on faith without any Buddhist practice, which drew criticism from established Buddhist sects at the time, and even Hōnen's other disciples.

After Hōnen's primary patron, Kujō Kanezane complained in a letter to Hōnen expressing confusion, Hōnen censured Kōsai, and asked his other disciples to sign a seven-article pledge agreeing to adhere to wholesome Buddhist conduct, as well as not slandering other teachings.  Unrepentant, Kōsai, continued to teach his doctrine, and like other disciples, was exiled from Kyoto in 1207 during the Karoku Persecution.

Kōsai continued to teach the single-recitation method of Pure Land Buddhism in Shikoku, and gathered other followers before his sect was discredited and died out.  Among his harshest and most vocal critics was Benchō, another disciple of Hōnen.

References

Bibliography

External links 
 
 
 Jodo Shu Research Institute, Shichikajo-kishomon (Seven Article Pledge)

Japanese Buddhist clergy
Jōdo-shū Buddhist priests
Kamakura period Buddhist clergy
1163 births
1247 deaths